Jaakko Hänninen (born 16 April 1997) is a Finnish cyclist, who currently rides for UCI WorldTeam . Having competed for French amateur teams from 2016, Hänninen joined  in August 2019. In October 2020, he was named in the startlist for the 2020 Giro d'Italia.

Major results

2015
 National Junior Road Championships
1st  Road race
1st  Time trial
2017
 National Under-23 Road Championships
1st  Road race
1st  Time trial
 2nd Road race, National Road Championships
2018
 1st Tour du Gévaudan Occitanie
 3rd  Road race, UCI Road World Under-23 Championships
 8th Scandinavian Race Uppsala
2019
 4th Tour du Doubs
2021 
 10th Mercan'Tour Classic Alpes-Maritimes
2022
 4th Overall Tour de l'Ain

Grand Tour general classification results timeline

References

External links

1997 births
Living people
Finnish male cyclists
People from Ruokolahti
Sportspeople from South Karelia